Hahamakin ang Lahat (International title: Love and Defiance / ) is a Philippine television drama romance series broadcast by GMA Network. Directed by Don Michael Perez, it stars Joyce Ching and Kristofer Martin. It premiered on October 31, 2016 on the network's Afternoon Prime line up replacing Sinungaling Mong Puso. The series concluded on February 17, 2017 with a total of 80 episodes. It was replaced by Legally Blind in its timeslot.

The series is streaming online on YouTube.

Premise
Ivy and Nelson will fall in love each other. Due to Ivy's father's disapproval to her relationship with Nelson, the two will escape which will lead to a car crash and Nelson's death. Ivy will find out that she's pregnant and the child will be raised by her sister.

Cast and characters

Lead cast
 Joyce Ching as Rachel Tan-Ke /Patricia Tan Solano Labsat 
 Kristofer Martin as Luisito "Junior / Junjun" Labsat Jr.

Supporting cast
 Snooky Serna as Laura Caraca-Labsat
 Ariel Rivera as Nelson Solano / Alfred Benitez
 Eula Valdez as Ivy Tan-Ke
 Thea Tolentino as Phoebe Ke
 Chinggoy Alonzo as Ericson Tan
 Jett Pangan as Charlie Ke
 Marc Abaya as Luisito "Sito" Labsat Sr.
 Marina Benipayo as Cynthia Tan-Ke
 Renz Valerio as Puloy Dionisio
 Mona Louise Rey as Gigi Labsat
 Bruno Gabriel as Crisanto "Santi" Valderama III

Recurring cast
 Tina Monasterio as Divina Valderama
 Marlon Mance as Renato Valderama
 Marika Sasaki as Aliyah
 Lovely Rivero as Lily
 Allysa del Real as Cheska 
 Mike "Pekto" Nacua as Johnny
 Jana Trites as Didith
 Mel Kimura as Bibsy
 Chinggay Riego as Flor
 Rebecca Chuaunsu as Karen
 Dexter Doria as Inyang

Guest cast
 Daria Ramirez as Elisa "Loring" Caraca
 Jordan Hong as Franklin Ke
 Leanne Bautista as young Rachel 
 Geson Granado as young Luisito
 Althea Ablan as young Phoebe

Ratings
According to AGB Nielsen Philippines' Mega Manila household television ratings, the pilot episode of Hahamakin ang Lahat earned a 10.1% rating. While the final episode scored a 13.4% rating.

Accolades

References

External links
 
 

2016 Philippine television series debuts
2017 Philippine television series endings
Filipino-language television shows
GMA Network drama series
Philippine romance television series
Television shows set in Quezon City